Hans-Joachim Preil (June 26, 1923 – November 2, 1999) was an East German comedian.

Biography
Preil begun studying acting at 1939. He later appeared on the stages of theaters in Quedlinburg, Aschersleben, Bernburg and Magdeburg. During 1951, he met fellow actor Rolf Herricht. The two founded a comedy duo, 'Herricht & Preil', making their first sketch, 'The Chess Match', in 1953. In their act, Herricht was the 'comic' while Preil served as the 'straight man'. During the 1950s, Preil worked as artistic director in the theaters of Magdeburg and Bernburg, while continuing to perform in sketches with Herricht. By 1959, Deutscher Fernsehfunk had broadcast one of their acts, which was highly successful with the audience. They began appearing regularly on television, and turned to the most recognized comedians of the German Democratic Republic.

During the 1960s, the pair appeared in two DEFA comedy films the plots of which centered around their comical skills. The first -- Hands Up, Or I'll Shoot (1966) -- portrayed Herricht as a mentally unstable detective called Holmes and Preil as an antique expert. It was banned by the 11th Plenum of the Socialist Unity Party of Germany which deemed that it was critical of the law enforcement system. The film finally was released in 2009. The second, My Friend Sybille (1967), presented the two as junior and senior travel guides in a cruise at the Black Sea. 

In addition to his acting career, Preil also worked as an assistant-director in the Babelsberg Studios of DEFA, and wrote several plays for theater.

Preil was awarded the Art Prize of the German Democratic Republic on 13 May 1977.

After Herricht's death in 1981, Preil stopped appearing in comedy live sketches, but continued directing and playing on television. He retired in 1991. At 1998, he received the Golden Hen Award for Lifetime Achievement, in the presence of President Roman Herzog.

Filmography

Further reading
Hans-Joachim Preil. Aber, Herr Preil. Ullstein (1994).

References

External links

1923 births
1999 deaths
People from Koszalin
People from the Province of Pomerania
German male stage actors
German male film actors
German male television actors
German male comedians
Recipients of the Art Prize of the German Democratic Republic
20th-century German male actors
20th-century comedians